Kenneth Baxter Wolf  (born June 1, 1957) is an American historian and scholar of medieval studies.

Biography 
Wolf is the John Sutton Miner Professor of History and Professor of Classics at Pomona College in Claremont, California, where he has taught since 1985.

Works

Authored
Christian Martyrs in Muslim Spain (Cambridge University Press, 1988)
The Normans and Their Historians in Eleventh-Century Italy (University of Pennsylvania Press, 1995)
The Poverty of Riches. St. Francis of Assisi Reconsidered (Oxford University Press, 2003)

Translated
Conquerors and Chroniclers of Early Medieval Spain (Liverpool University Press, 1990)
The Deeds of Count Roger and of His Brother Duke Robert Guiscard (University of Michigan Press, 2005)
The Life and Afterlife of St. Elizabeth of Hungary and Testimony from her Canonization Hearings (Oxford University Press, 2011)

References

External links

American medievalists
Pomona College faculty
1957 births
Living people
Historians from California